{{DISPLAYTITLE:Indium (111In) igovomab}}

Indium (111In) igovomab (trade name Indimacis-125) was a mouse monoclonal antibody for the diagnosis of ovarian cancer.

Linked to the chelating agent DTPA and labelled with Indium-111, it was used for imaging (radio-immuno scintigraphy) of the cancer. The drug is no longer available.

References

Monoclonal antibodies for tumors